Censure is a formal, public, group condemnation of an individual, often a group member, whose actions run counter to the group's acceptable standards for individual behavior. In the United States, governmental censure is done when a body's members wish to publicly reprimand the president of the United States, a member of Congress, a judge or a cabinet member.  It is a formal statement of disapproval. It relies on the target's sense of shame or their constituents' subsequent disapproval, without which it has little practical effect when done on members of Congress and no practical effect when done on the president.

The United States Constitution specifically grants impeachment and conviction powers, respectively, to the House of Representatives and Senate. It also grants both congressional bodies the power to expel their own members, though it does not mention censure. Each body adopts rules allowing censure, which is "stronger than a simple rebuke, but not as strong as expulsion." In general, each house of Congress is responsible for invoking censure against its own members; censure against other government officials is not common. Because censure is not specifically mentioned as the accepted form of reprimand, many censure actions against members of Congress may be listed officially as rebuke, condemnation, or denouncement.

Members of Congress who have been censured are required to give up any committee chairs they hold. Like a reprimand, a censure does not remove a member from their office so they retain their title, stature, and power to vote. There are also no legal consequences that come with a reprimand or censure. The main difference is that a reprimand is "considered a slap on the wrist and can be given in private and even in a letter," while a censure is "a form of public shaming in which the politician must stand before their peers to listen to the censure resolution."

Presidential censures

Adopted resolutions

There have been four cases in U.S. history where the House of Representatives or the Senate adopted a resolution that, in its original form, would censure the president.

The censure of President Andrew Jackson "remains the clearest case of presidential censure by resolution." In 1834, while under Whig control, the Senate censured Jackson, a member of the Democratic Party, for withholding documents relating to his actions in defunding the Bank of the United States. During the waning months of Jackson's term, his Democratic allies succeeded in expunging the censure.

In 1860, the House of Representatives adopted a resolution admonishing both President James Buchanan and Secretary of the Navy Isaac Toucey for allegedly awarding contracts on the basis of "party relations." The House may have intended this resolution as a lesser reprimand than a formal censure.

In two other cases, the Senate adopted a resolution that was originally introduced to censure the president, but that, in its final form, did not overtly censure the president.

In 1864, during the American Civil War, Senator Garrett Davis introduced a resolution to censure President Abraham Lincoln for allowing two individuals to resume their service as generals after winning election to Congress. The final resolution adopted by the Senate required generals to be "re-appointed in the manner provided by the Constitution," but did not overtly censure Lincoln.

In 1912, Senator Joseph Weldon Bailey introduced a resolution censuring President William Howard Taft for allegedly interfering with a disputed Senate election. The final Senate resolution did not specifically refer to Taft, but stated that presidential interference in a disputed Senate race would warrant censure.

Other censure attempts

Several other presidents have been subject to censure attempts in which no formal resolution was adopted by either the House or the Senate. In 1800, Representative Edward Livingston of New York introduced a censure motion against President John Adams. In 1842, Whigs attempted to impeach President John Tyler following a long period of hostility with the president.  When that action could not get through Congress, a select Senate committee dominated by Whigs censured Tyler instead. In 1848, Congressman George Ashmun led an effort to censure President James K. Polk, on the grounds that the Mexican–American War had been "unnecessarily and unconstitutionally begun by the President." The House of Representatives voted to add Ashmun's censure as an amendment to a resolution under consideration by the House, but the resolution itself was never adopted by the House. In 1871, Senator Charles Sumner introduced an unsuccessful resolution to censure President Ulysses S. Grant for deploying ships to the Dominican Republic without the approval of Congress. In 1952, Congressman Burr Powell Harrison introduced a resolution censuring President Harry S. Truman for seizing control of steel mills during the 1952 steel strike. The resolution ultimately did not receive a vote.

President Richard M. Nixon was the subject of several censure resolutions introduced in the House of Representatives; most of the resolutions were related to the Watergate scandal. In 1972, a resolution censuring Nixon for his handling of the Vietnam War was introduced. A separate series of censure resolutions were introduced after the "Saturday Night Massacre" in October 1973. Another series of resolutions were introduced in July 1974. None of the resolutions were adopted, but Nixon resigned from office in August 1974.

In 1998, resolutions to censure President Bill Clinton for his role in the Monica Lewinsky scandal were introduced and failed. The activist group MoveOn.org originated in 1998, after the group's founders began a petition urging the Republican-controlled Congress to "censure President Clinton and move on"—i.e., to drop impeachment proceedings, pass a censure of Clinton, and focus on other matters. From 2005 to 2007, members of Congress introduced several resolutions to censure President George W. Bush and other members of the Bush administration. Most of the resolutions focused on Bush's handling of the Iraq War, but one resolution concerned the administration's "unlawful authorization of wiretaps of Americans" and two others alleged that Bush and Attorney General Alberto Gonzales had violated "statutes, treaties, and the Constitution." From 2013 to 2016, members of Congress introduced several resolutions to censure President Barack Obama. These resolutions charged that Obama had usurped the "legislative power of Congress” or had acted unlawfully. None of the resolutions to censure Bush or Obama were adopted.

On August 18, 2017, a resolution was introduced in the House to censure President Donald Trump for his comments "that 'both sides' were to blame for the violence in" the Unite the Right rally. On January 18, 2018 another motion to censure Trump was introduced in the House of Representatives by Rep. Cedric Richmond (D), who at the time was the Chairman of the Congressional Black Caucus, for Trump's remark, alleged by people in the room, stating "Why do we want all these people from 'shithole countries' coming here?" According to people in the room at the time, Trump was referring to people from Haiti and African nations coming to the United States of America. The censure motion failed to reach any legislative action. This comment was alleged to have been made on January 11, 2018 in an Oval Office meeting with lawmakers regarding immigration.

Senatorial censures

The U.S. Senate has developed procedures for taking disciplinary action against senators through such measures as formal censure or actual expulsion from the Senate.  The Senate has two basic forms of punishment available to it: expulsion, which requires a two-thirds vote; or censure, which requires a majority vote. Censure is a formal statement of disapproval. While censure (sometimes referred to as condemnation or denouncement) is less severe than expulsion in that it does not remove a senator from office, it is nevertheless a formal statement of disapproval that can have a powerful psychological effect on a member and on that member's relationships in the Senate.

In the history of the Senate, 10 U.S. Senators have been censured, the most famous being Joseph McCarthy.
Their transgressions have ranged from breach of confidentiality to fighting in the Senate chamber and more generally for "conduct that tends to bring the Senate into dishonor and disrepute".

House censures

The House of Representatives is authorized to censure its own members by the scope of United States Constitution (Article I, Section 5, clause 2). In the House of Representatives, censure is essentially a form of public humiliation carried out on the House floor.  As the Speaker of the House reads out a resolution rebuking a member for a specified misconduct, that member must stand in the House well and listen to it.  This process has been described as a morality play in miniature.

In the history of the House, censure has been used 24 times, and most of the cases arose during the 19th century. In the modern history of the United States House Committee on Standards of Official Conduct (since 1966), censure has been used seven times.

Cabinet censures

 The first attempted use of censure in the United States was directed at George Washington's treasury secretary  Alexander Hamilton, who was accused of misadministration of two Congressionally authorized loans under the Funding Act of 1790 by William Giles.
 Augustus Hill Garland, Attorney General in Grover Cleveland's administration, was censured in 1886 for failing to provide documents about the firing of a federal prosecutor.

Censure at other levels of government

References

Further reading
 Butler, Anne M., and Wendy Wolff, United States Senate Election, Expulsion and Censure Cases, 1793–1900 (Washington: Government Printing Office, 1995)
Expulsion, Censure, Reprimand, and Fine: Legislative Discipline in the House of Representatives Congressional Research Service
Final Report of the Joint Committee on the Organization of Congress (December 1993):Enforcement of Ethical Standards in Congress
Resolutions Censuring the President: History and Context, 1st-114th Congresses Congressional Research Service

Incidental motions
Legislative branch of the United States government